Dallas Lee Braden (born August 13, 1983) is an American former professional baseball player and television sports commentator. The following season, shoulder problems were the first of a series of injuries that forced him to retire in 2014 after not throwing a pitch for two and a half seasons. After his playing career, Braden became a television baseball analyst, working for the ESPN network.

Early life

Braden was born in Phoenix, Arizona. He played Little League baseball in Stockton, California, in the Hoover Tyler Little League. Braden graduated from Stagg High School in Stockton, where he played baseball and ran cross country. His mother, Jodie Atwood, died of cancer during his senior year. After his mother's death, he lived with his maternal grandmother.

Braden was first drafted by the Atlanta Braves in the 46th round of the 2001 MLB Draft, but he did not sign. Braden played two seasons of college baseball at American River College in Sacramento County, California, where he posted a combined record of 12–4 including a complete game against Fresno City College while allowing one hit and striking out 14 batters. He then played one season for the Texas Tech Red Raiders.

Professional career
The Oakland Athletics drafted Braden out of Texas Tech in the 24th round of the 2004 MLB Draft.

Minor League Baseball
In 2004, Braden began the season with at Class A Short Season Vancouver Canadians. He made eight relief appearances, picking up a pair of victories and was promoted to the Class A Kane County Cougars and pitched exclusively as a starter. He made five starts for Kane County, and posted a 2–1 record.

In 2005, Braden split the season between the Class A-Advanced Stockton Ports and  the Double-A Midland RockHounds. He posted a 6–0 record for the Ports, and a 9–5 mark for the RockHounds. His composite total of 15 wins led all A's minor league pitchers and earned him Pitcher of the Year honors for the Athletics organization. He underwent shoulder surgery in the 2005–06 offseason. At the beginning of his minor league career, Braden was known for throwing the screwball; he abandoned it shortly after his shoulder surgery.

Braden began the 2006 season on a rehabilitation assignment with the rookie league Arizona League Athletics. He made six starts, going 2–0 and moved up to Stockton, where was also 2–0 with a 6.23 ERA. He was promoted to Double-A Midland where he made one start, giving up six runs in  innings pitched while receiving a no decision. His composite 2006 numbers were: 4–0 record, 4.10 ERA, 55 strikeouts and eight walks in  innings of work.

Oakland Athletics

2007
Braden began 2007 in Double-A Midland and was called up to the Triple-A Sacramento River Cats after one start. When Rich Harden got hurt on April 23, he was called up to the majors to replace him. On April 24, 2007, Braden made his first major league start and picked up the win against the Baltimore Orioles. He went 1–8 that season for Oakland, pitching  innings across 20 games (14 starts) with 55 strikeouts and 26 walks.

2008
In 2008, Braden split time between Triple-A Sacramento and Oakland. He posted an ERA of 4.14 in 19 MLB games (10 starts), pitching  innings with 41 strikeouts and 25 walks.

2009
Braden was Oakland's Opening Day starter in 2009, giving up three runs in six innings to the Los Angeles Angels on April 6 and taking the loss. He spent the entire season with Oakland, appearing in 22 games (all starts) while compiling an 8–9 record with 3.89 ERA, pitching  innings with 81 strikeouts at 42 walks.

2010

On April 6, 2010, Braden's first outing of the season, he struck out a career high 10 batters in seven innings, allowing one run on four hits and walked one. He received a no-decision, but the team got the win in the tenth inning.

On April 22, Braden was pitching against the New York Yankees when he became angry with Yankees third baseman Alex Rodriguez for breaking an unwritten rule when Rodriguez ran across the pitcher's mound on his way back to first base after a foul ball. At the end of the inning as the players were switching sides, Braden yelled at Rodriguez. Rodriguez offered no apology and later engaged Braden in the press, pointing to his short career and losing record.

Perfect game

On May 9, 2010, Braden pitched the 19th perfect game in MLB history against the Tampa Bay Rays in Oakland. He did it in 109 pitches, 77 of which were strikes, with catcher Landon Powell behind the plate. Braden had lost his mother to melanoma, so pitching the 19th perfect game in major league history was of even greater significance to Braden because he achieved the feat on Mother's Day. 10 years later, Braden claimed to have pitched the game while hung over.

The Athletics celebrated the feat during the next homestand. On May 17, the A's placed a commemorative graphic on the outfield wall, next to Rickey Henderson's retired number. May 21 was called "Dallas Braden Day" by the City of Oakland. On May 22, Braden was awarded with the key to the city of Stockton at a Stockton Ports minor league game.

Braden went on to finish the 2010 season with an 11–14 record in 30 starts for the A's. He threw five complete games along with two shutouts, pitching a total of  innings with 113 strikeouts at 43 walks.

2011

Braden went on to pitch in three starts in 2011, with a 1–1 record and 3.00 ERA, before feeling discomfort in his shoulder. It was revealed he had a torn capsule in his left shoulder and would need immediate surgery. Braden missed the remainder of the 2011 season.

Retirement
On December 13, 2011, Braden avoided arbitration by signing a one-year deal. He made $3.35 million in guaranteed money, with $400,000 in incentives. Braden missed the entire 2012 season and on August 21, Braden required an additional surgery, this time to repair the rotator cuff of his shoulder. The surgery would also sideline him for the first half of the 2013 season. Following the season, Braden was let go and he became a free agent. Braden officially announced his retirement on January 14, 2014, citing his arm being a "shredded mess".

Career statistics
Overall, in his five seasons with Oakland, Braden appeared in 94 MLB games (79 starts), compiling a 26–36 record with 4.16 ERA while pitching  innings with 305 strikeouts and 141 walks. He did not have any postseason appearances, as the Athletics did not have a winning season in any of Braden's years with the team.

Braden threw four pitches: a cutter at 82 MPH, a fastball at 86–88 MPH, a slurve at 72–79 MPH and a changeup at 72 MPH.

Broadcasting career
In 2014, Braden joined ESPN as a Baseball Tonight analyst and, the next season, moved into the broadcast booth as a color analyst on games.

Early in the 2016 season, Braden was moved to ESPN's Monday Night Baseball booth following the network's dismissal of Curt Schilling. Braden was laid off with dozens of other ESPN employees on April 26, 2017.

On July 14, 2017, Braden debuted on NBC Sports California as a new field-level analyst for the A's broadcasts. Since then, he has substituted for Ray Fosse in the TV booth as a color commentator. His trademark call for replays of A's home runs is, “All aboard! Next stop... Pound-town!”

In 2017, Braden started a podcast and Facebook Live show, "Starting 9", with co-host Jared Carrabis on Barstool Sports that lasted until 2021.
He also hosts a radio show on Barstool's SiriusXM channel called Dialed In with Dallas Braden.

From April 2022, he became co-host to Carrabis' new podcast "Baseball is Dead" for DraftKings.

Personal life
Braden helps give food and money for Charity Communities in Stockton. On Thanksgiving, he personally collects and distributes food for the needy. In 2011, the University of the Pacific in Stockton gave Braden an Annual Community Service Award.

Braden threw out the first pitch at the opening ceremonies of the 2006 Little League World Series.

In October 2015, the Los Rios Community College District honored Braden as a distinguished alumnus on behalf of American River College where he was a student and played baseball for two seasons.

See also

List of Major League Baseball no-hitters

Bibliography
2006 Oakland Athletics Media Guide. Pg. 376. Produced by the Oakland Athletics Public Relations Department.

References

Further reading

External links

Dallas Braden evaluation in 2005 from CalLeaguers.com

1983 births
Living people
American expatriate baseball players in Canada
Barstool Sports people
Major League Baseball pitchers
Oakland Athletics players
American River Beavers baseball players
Major League Baseball pitchers who have pitched a perfect game
Baseball players from Phoenix, Arizona
Texas Tech Red Raiders baseball players
Vancouver Canadians players
Kane County Cougars players
Stockton Ports players
Arizona League Athletics players
Sacramento River Cats players
Baseball players from Stockton, California
Major League Baseball broadcasters
Oakland Athletics announcers